This page is about the Cassia tora described by Linnaeus. Later authors usually applied the taxon to Senna obtusifolia.

Senna tora (originally described by Linnaeus as Cassia tora) is a plant species in the family Fabaceae and the subfamily Caesalpinioideae. Its name is derived from its Sinhala name tora (තෝර).  It grows wild in most of the tropics and is considered a weed in many places. Its native range is in Central America. Its most common English name is sickle senna or sickle wild sensitive-plant. Other common names include sickle pod, tora, coffee pod and foetid cassia. It is often confused with Chinese senna or sickle pod, Senna obtusifolia.

Description
Senna tora is an herbaceous annual foetid herb. The leaves grow up to 3–4.5 centimeters long. The stems have distinct smelling foliage when young. The flowers occur in pairs in axils of leaves with five petals and pale yellow in colour. The stamens are of unequal length. The pods are somewhat flattened or four angled, 10–15 cm long and sickle shaped, hence the common name sickle pod. There are 30–50 seeds within a pod.

Growing conditions
Senna tora is considered an annual weed, is very stress tolerant, and is easily grown. In India, it occurs as a wasteland rainy season weed and its usual flowering time is after the monsoon rains, during the period of October to February. Senna tora grows in dry soil from sea level up to 1800 meters. The seed can remain viable for up to twenty years. Up to 1000 plants can emerge per square meter following rain. Once the seed has matured, it is gathered and dried in the sun. In South Asia, it usually dies off in the dry season of July–October.

Pests/diseases
In Vanuatu, which is an island in the South Pacific, Senna tora has been known to suffer limited damage by the leaf-eating larvae of a species of moth called Stegasta variana, a gelechiid moth.

Uses

Senna tora has many uses. The whole plant and roots, leaves, and seeds have been widely used in traditional Indian and South Asian medicine. The plant and seeds are edible. Young leaves can be cooked as a vegetable while the roasted seeds are used as a substitute coffee. In Sri Lanka, the flowers are added to food. It is used as a natural pesticide in organic farms, and as a powder commonly used in the pet food industry. It is mixed with guar gum for use in mining and other industrial applications. The seeds and leaves are used to treat skin disease and its seeds can be utilized as a laxative. Senna tora is made into tea. In the Republic of Korea, it is believed to rejuvenate human vision. This tea has been referred to as "coffee-tea", because of its taste and its coffee aroma.
Since Senna tora has an external germicide and antiparasitic character, it has been used for treating skin diseases such as leprosy, ringworm, itching and psoriasis and also for snakebites. Other medicinal provisions from plant parts include balm for arthritis using the leaves.

Economics
The galactomannans (a form of polysaccharide) from Senna tora (CT gum), after proper processing and chemical derivatization (converting chemical into a product of a similar structure), could function as an improved and more economical thickener than locust bean gum for textiles, because of the bean gum’s current high price ($18/kg) and limited availability. Most of the CT-gum processing plants in India are located in Gujarat state because of the availability of beans in the neighbouring states, but the widespread use of these beans as vegetables and seeds as cattle feed has been pushing up the raw material cost for the CT-gum industry. The total fixed capacity in the country is 0.2 million tonnes for splits and 59,000 for powder based on Senna tora seeds. The capacity utilization in the industry has been around 70 percent for the last three years.  Apart from domestic consumption, there are now noteworthy exports of cassia powder of the international standard to various countries. This includes the United States of America, Australia, Germany, France, Spain, Denmark, Italy, the Netherlands, Belgium, New Zealand, the United Kingdom, Singapore and Japan. The export value of has been progressively increasing over the last five years. Comprehensive export data disclosed that Japan and the UK receive a regular supply, while the United States market fluctuates. However, the export growth rate plainly shows the difference between quantity and value, which leads to a low price per unit price.

Cultivation
Soak the seeds for 2–3 hours in warm water before sowing it from early spring to early summer in a warm greenhouse or pot in your own home. The seed usually germinates in 1–12 weeks at 23°C. Senna tora can be transplanted.

Synonyms
The taxonomic history of this plant is extremely confused, even by the standards of Senna and Cassia. S. tora and S. obtusifolia were for long and are often still held to be—and may eventually be verified as—a single species. Hence, taxa referring to either species were indiscriminately applied to both.

 Cassia boreensis Miq.
 Cassia borneensis Miq.
 Cassia gallinaria Collad.
 Cassia numilis Collad.
Apparently a misprint for Cassia humilis, which would have been applied to this species in error as it is properly a synonym of Senna obtusifolia and Chamaecrista kunthiana, depending on the author.
 Cassia tora L.
As discussed above, the Cassia tora of other authors refers to Senna obtusifolia
 Cassia tora L. var. borneensis (Miq.) Miq.
Cassia tora L. var. b, var. humilis, and var. obtusifolia all refer to Senna obtusifolia
 Emelista tora Britton & Rose

Habitat
Senna tora is found in many parts of the world. It grows abundantly in parts of Afghanistan, India, Nigeria, China, Pakistan, Myanmar, Nepal and Bhutan. It is also grown and cultivated areas in the Himalayas at the elevation of 1400 meters in Nepal. It is distributed throughout India, Sri Lanka, West China and the tropics, particularly in forest and tribal areas.

It is considered invasive in New-Caledonia.

Gallery

Footnotes

References
  (2005): Senna tora (L.) Roxb.. Version 10.01, November 2005. Retrieved 2007-DEC-20.
  (2007): Senna tora (L.) Roxb. species factsheet1 October 2022. Retrieved 23 October 2022.

tora
Flora of Central America
Plants used in Ayurveda
Edible legumes
Plants described in 1753
Taxa named by Carl Linnaeus